Pär Asp (born 14 August 1982) is a retired Swedish footballer who played as a defender.

References

External links

1982 births
Living people
Association football defenders
IF Brommapojkarna players
Gefle IF players
Allsvenskan players
Superettan players
Swedish footballers